

Gadag Institute of Medical Sciences 

Gadag Institute of Medical Sciences is an Indian government medical college. It is located in Mallasamudra village of Gadag, Karnataka, India. The institution is affiliated with Rajiv Gandhi University of Health Sciences and offers courses for medical, paramedical and nursing students.

The College is spread over 54 acres of land, beside Lush greenery Mountains and Windmills in the premises of District Hospital at outskirts of Gadag.

This Medical College building covers 51,000 sq. meter of the area where Two Examination halls available each with 250 Seating capacity.

The institute is fully equipped with Laboratories, Museums,Amphitheatre  and there are 6 Lecture Halls available, 5 lecture halls situated in college each with 180 seating capacity and one in hospital with 200 Seating capacity.

There are 302 well educated Teaching Faculty available. This College has separate common rooms for boys and girls each with 160sqm with attached toilet facility.

Library
The Central Library of the college spreading over 2400sq.m, 5513 books and 28 Indian,12 foreign journals.

And has a wide collection of medical literature including Books, Reference Sources, CD, DVDs, Journals, E-Journals, E-books and pamphlets to the faculty and medical students.

This library has 600 seating capacity.

Gadag Institute of Medical Sciences Ranking 
Below College Ranking is based on How parents and students Preferred Gadag Institute of Medical Sciences during  NEET UG 2021 MCC and state counselling.

All India Ranking is 254

Karnataka State Ranking is 22.

Affiliated Teaching Hospitals
 Affiliated Teaching hospitals with the institution are:
 Government District Teaching Hospital Gadag
 Dundappa Manvi Maternal and Child Health Care Hospital, K.C. Rani Road, Gadag
 Urban Health Training Centre, Gandhi Circle,  Gadag
 Primary Health Centre,  Hulkoti
 Primary Health Centre, Nagavi
 Shirahatti Taluk Hospital,  Shirahatti 
 Lakshmeshwar Taluk Hospital,  Laxmeshwar

UG / PG Courses Offered by the Institute

Undergraduate courses
The college offers four and a half year M.B.B.S courses with a one-year  Compulsory Rotating Medical Internship at the above mentioned  Affiliated Teaching hospitals. 

Undergraduate courses include M.B.B.S,  Bachelor of Science in Nursing and  Diploma in Nursing.

Postgraduate courses

Gadag Institute of Medical Sciences is the only college overseen by the  National Board of Examinations to offer a Post-graduate  DNB course in surgery in Karnataka.

The institute is the only medical college in India to obtain post-graduate seats in its all clinical departments within five years of its inception.

Admission is coordinated through PG  NEET conducted by  DNB, India.

Post-graduate courses including  MD,  MS,  DNB, and  CPS are offered.

Departments
 Anatomy
 Physiology
 Biochemistry
 Pharmacology
 Pathology
 Microbiology
  Forensic medicine
 Community Medicine
 General medicine
  Pediatric
 TB and Chest
  Skin & V D
 Psychiatry
 General surgery - The college is presently permitted by the Indian government to run a DNB course in surgery. This is the first post-graduate course to be offered.
  Orthopedics
  ENT 
 Ophthalmology
  OBG
 Anesthesia
 Radiology
 Dentistry

Hostel 
Boys hostel has 90 rooms and girls hostel has 90 rooms with 24 hours of well-maintained drinking & Non Drinking water supply.

Recreation facilities, visitor room, Airconditioned and computer with internet facilities are available.

Students get food from the hygienic kitchen with comfortable Dining system.

Well equipped recreation room and gymnasium for physical workouts for better health maintaining practice, and sports activities and training for sports dreamed students.

It has large and spacious TV room for students relaxation with regular vigilance by the anti ragging squad for controlling ragging problems from and for the students.

References

External links
 

Medical colleges in Karnataka